Oxelumab is a human monoclonal antibody designed for the treatment of asthma.

Oxelumab was developed by Genentech and co-developed by Roche.

References 

Hoffmann-La Roche brands
Genentech brands
Experimental drugs